Andrei Anatolyevich Pobedenny (born 3 October 1966) is a former Russian football player and referee.

He worked as an assistant referee in the Russian Third League in 1996–1997.

References

1966 births
Living people
Soviet footballers
FC Dynamo Stavropol players
Russian footballers
Russian Premier League players
FC Rostov players
Russian football referees
Association football goalkeepers